Pethia longicauda is a species of cyprinid fish native to India where it is endemic to Hiranyakeshi river in Maharashtra, India.  This species can reach a length of  SL.

References 

Pethia
Fish of India
Taxa named by Unmesh Katwate
Taxa named by Mandar S. Paingankar
Taxa named by Neelesh Dahanukar
Taxa named by Rajeev Raghavan
Fish described in 2014